North v South is a 2015 British drama film written and directed by Steven Nesbit, and featuring Freema Agyeman and Keith Allen.

Plot

The film is about feuding criminal gangs, divided along England's North–South divide.

Cast

 Freema Agyeman as Penny
 Keith Allen as Tony Lefevre
 Bernard Hill as John Claridge
 Steven Berkoff as Vic Clarke
 Charlotte Hope as Willow Clarke

Release
The film was not released to cinemas, but directly to DVD.

Reception
The film was poorly received by critics, with a review in The Guardian giving the film only two out of five stars: "Despite its semi-interesting premise, a new take on star-crossed lovers, Steven Nesbit’s low-budget Brit gangster flick fails to deliver".

References

External links

2015 films
2015 crime drama films
British crime drama films
Films shot in Greater Manchester
2010s English-language films
2010s British films